Aerovías de México, S.A. de C.V. operating as Aeroméxico (stylized as AM), is the flag carrier airline of Mexico, based in Mexico City. It operates scheduled services to more than 90 destinations in Mexico; North, South and Central America; the Caribbean, Europe, and Asia. Its main base and hub is located in Mexico City, with secondary hubs in Guadalajara and Monterrey. The headquarters is in the Torre MAPFRE on Paseo de la Reforma, formerly in its own building overlooking the Diana the Huntress Fountain, but moved down the street in 2017 to the Torre MAPFRE tower across from the Mexican Stock Exchange when the old building was demolished and replaced with a much taller, newer tower.

Grupo Aeroméxico includes Aeroméxico, Aeroméxico Connect (regional subsidiary), and Aeroméxico Contigo (product on select U.S.-Mexico routes). The group currently holds the No. 2 place in domestic market share behind Volaris, with 24.2%; and No. 1 place in international market share with 15.8%, in the 12 months ending March 2020, becoming Mexico's largest international airline group. Aeroméxico is one of the four founding members of the SkyTeam airline alliance, along with Air France, Delta Air Lines and Korean Air.

Aeroméxico works closely with the U.S. carrier Delta Air Lines, which owns part of Aeroméxico and in 2015 announced its intention to acquire up to 49%. On 8 May 2017, a joint commercial agreement (JCA), came into effect, whereby the airlines share information, costs, and revenues on all their flights between the United States and Mexico.

In 2016, the company flew 19.703 million passengers (up 5.0% vs. previous year), of which 13.047 million domestic (+3.7%) and 6.656 million international (+7.6%). It flew 34.776 million revenue passenger kilometers (RPKs), had 43.362 million available seat kilometers (ASKs), and an 80.3% load factor.

History

1934
The airline was established as Aeronaves de México on 15 September 1934, by Antonio Díaz Lombardo. Its first aircraft was a Stinson SR Reliant 5A (registered XB-AJI). Julio Zinser piloted the maiden flight on the Mexico City – Acapulco route on 14 September 1934.

1940s
When World War II began, the airline continued to grow with the help of Pan Am, which owned 25% of the new Mexican airline. Aeroméxico saw few changes for the next two decades. However, during the 1950s renovation began, and the airline took over various small competitor companies across the country, including Aerovías Guest (the second airline of the country at that time) that held the routes to Madrid and Paris. Aeroméxico added aircraft including the Douglas DC-3 and its successor, the Douglas DC-4.

1950s
During the late 1950s, the Douglas DC-4s were replaced by some pressurized Douglas DC-6s and two Bristol Britannias (the first turboprop passenger aircraft in the fleet) and in 1958, services were inaugurated to Idlewild Airport (now JFK) using the Britannias. The Mexico City-New York route would prove profitable for "Aeronaves" and its North American competitors. The airline was nationalised in 1959.

1960s
In the early 1960s, the fleet of Aeronaves de México (Aeroméxico) included Douglas DC-3, Douglas DC-6, and Bristol Britannia aircraft. Starting in 1961, "Aeronaves" began replacing its piston-engined aircraft with new jets. The first jet-engined aircraft were a pair of Douglas DC-8s. The DC-8s were used on routes within Mexico and to New York City. In 1963, Aeronaves de México (Aeroméxico) took over Aerovias Guest airlines and they were merged under the name Aeronaves de México. Later in the 1960s, more DC-8s were added and service to Europe was resumed, operated by two de Havilland Comet 4C jet aircraft dry-leased by Aerovías Guest prior to the merger.

1970s

The 1970s brought dramatic changes for Aeroméxico. In 1970, under a government plan, Mexican domestic airlines were nationalized into an integrated air transport system under the control of Aeronaves de México. The system included eight smaller carriers, although these were later disbanded.
During the early 1970s, the remaining Douglas DC-6 and Bristol Britannia aircraft were retired. A new color scheme (orange and black) was introduced and the airline changed its name from "Aeronaves de México" to its current, shortened version of Aeroméxico in February 1972.

Aeroméxico, as one of the launch customers of the McDonnell Douglas DC-10-30 program, received the first of its aircraft in 1974. That same year the airline also took delivery of its first seven McDonnell Douglas DC-9-32s. During this period the airline's popularity and visibility grew dramatically. This was due in part to Aeroméxico's involvement in Mexican movies. Basically, every time characters in any movie produced in Mexico had to fly somewhere, they were depicted as flying on Aeroméxico aircraft. Service to Canada was initiated, and in the early 1970s two more DC-9-15s were added to the fleet.

1980s
The early 1980s were marked by expansion. A new color scheme was introduced (orange paint and silver), two DC-10-15s and a DC-10-30 were added in 1981 and in 1984. Aeroméxico, one of the launch customers of the McDonnell Douglas MD-82 (an elongated version of the DC-9), received its first two in late 1981. Between 1980 and 1981, eight more DC-9-32 aircraft were added.
On 31 August 1986, the company suffered its only fatal accident outside Mexico when Aeroméxico Flight 498, a Douglas DC-9, approaching Los Angeles International Airport was struck by a light aircraft. Both aircraft then fell to earth in the Los Angeles suburb of Cerritos, California. All 64 passengers and crew on board the DC-9-32 were killed, as were the three people in the light aircraft and 15 people on the ground. After three years and a long trial, the aircraft's crew and the airline were found not to blame. This was because the pilot of the Piper had strayed into an air traffic control zone reserved for commercial flights. That same year, the airline acquired the charter carrier GATSA and used it for charter operations until December.
In April 1988, the state-owned company was declared bankrupt and grounded for three months because of lack of organization, a fleet with an average of 20 years without a renovation plan and a depredating administration by the Mexican Government. In August, a privatization program was underway. This involved retiring the eight Douglas DC-8s along with the remaining ten DC-9-15 aircraft. After a strike and bankruptcy between April and May 1988, a privatization process started and included a new corporate name (Aerovias de Mexico SA de CV). The airline restarted operations with some of its predecessor's assets, including the headquarters building, maintenance hangar, some aircraft, and some former Aeronaves de Mexico employees.

1990s
The early 1990s were turbulent times, with the rise in fuel costs due to the Gulf War, and a domestic fare war caused by start-up airlines like TAESA, Servicios Aéreos Rutas Oriente, Aviacsa, among others, as well as constant labor problems. In April 1991 the first two 767-200ERs were introduced to the fleet starting to replace DC-10s in services to Europe, New York, and Tijuana, another two 767-300ERs joined the fleet later that year. This was all a part of a renovation and expansion program to introduce 24 direct flights to Madrid and Paris from Mexico City with Boeing 767s as well as services to Frankfurt via Paris and Rome via Madrid.

In 1992, Grupo Aeroméxico was among other investors that failed to consummate the acquisition of Continental Airlines. After failing to invest in Continental, Aeroméxico acquired the bankrupt Aeroperú from the Peruvian government.

In 1993, Aeroméxico Group took over Mexicana, the second-largest airline in the Mexican market under the same management. There was a great dispute in June 1993 with the pilot union regarding the transfer of flights to regional subsidiary Aeromonterrey, which had non-union pilots. Between 1994 and 1995, the six DC-10 aircraft in the fleet were finally retired. Their last revenue flight was in 1995.

In December 1994, (three weeks after Carlos Salinas de Gortari left the office), the first of several devaluations in the next 18 months started, giving way to an economic crisis in Mexico. As a consequence, Aeroméxico had to cut capacity and flights to Frankfurt and Rome were canceled, four McDonnell Douglas MD-80s and four Boeing 767s were returned to their lessors, early retirement for pilots and other staff was underway, and a new Boeing 767 due for delivery in April 1995 was instead transferred to another airline. Flights to Madrid and Paris were operated only by two Boeing 767-300ER jets.

In 1996, Cintra was created to prevent the two main carriers from going bankrupt. Some Boeing 757s of Aeroméxico's original renovation program were transferred to Mexicana and Aeroperú. The market and the airline recovered between 1996 and 1998; eight McDonnell Douglas MD80s were leased back along with two Boeing 767-200ERs.

The sale of Grupo Cintra was scheduled after several delays in September 1999, and with the looming presidential elections in 2000, everything was delayed once again. The ruling party lost the election after 70 years in office and all the policies changed. Due to the recession in 2000, the new government put everything on hold, waiting for better economic conditions to start the stock sell-off, and just when everything was about to start, the 11 September 2001 attacks occurred and nothing materialized since the two main carriers, Mexicana and Aeroméxico, were losing large amounts of money.

2000s

Between 2000 and 2005, Aeroméxico had an average fleet of 60 aircraft in mainline operation, plus 20 in Aerolitoral, as well as five CEOs during this time. On 22 June 2000, the airline, along with Air France, Delta, and Korean Air, founded the SkyTeam global airline alliance. After 9/11 and the Iraq War, it pursued a fleet renovation program. In 2003, the airline acquired its first Boeing 737-700 instead of the Boeing 717 as a replacement for its aging DC-9 aircraft. On 29 March 2006 Aeroméxico CEO, Andrés Conesa announced the inauguration of direct flights between Japan and Mexico City via Tijuana. This was after the purchase of two Boeing 777-200ERs, making Aeroméxico the third airline in Latin America to fly regularly to Asia, after Varig and the now-defunct VASP. Since Varig's demise, Aeroméxico is currently the only airline with this service. Aeroméxico resumed its Mexico City-Tijuana-Shanghai route twice a week as of 30 March 2010. Suspension of this flight was due to the 2009 flu pandemic.

On 29 June 2006, the International Lease Finance Corporation (ILFC) and Aeroméxico announced that the airline would operate three Boeing 787 Dreamliners. Aeroméxico's deliveries were scheduled to begin in early 2012. From 2006, Consorcio Aeroméxico S.A. de C.V., the parent company of Aeroméxico at the time, faced large debts and had no profits to pay them off, so it offered Aeroméxico for sale in 2007. In early October, a week-long auction was held, with Grupo Financiero Banamex, a unit of Citigroup, competing against the Saba family. On 17 October 2007, Banamex offered the highest bid and purchased the airline for US$249.1 million. In October 2010, Aeroméxico's largest competitor, Mexicana de Aviacion, filed for bankruptcy and was placed in administration.

2010s

Delta/Aeroméxico alliance
In 2011, Delta Air Lines and Aeroméxico signed an enhanced commercial alliance, building on an original agreement from 1994. The 2011 agreement provided for codeshare on all the carriers' Mexico–US flights; Delta investing US$65 million in Aeroméxico shares; and Delta gaining a seat on the Aeroméxico board of directors. 
 In March 2014, the airlines opened Tech Ops Mexico, a US$55 million joint maintenance, repair, and overhaul facility in Queretaro City, Mexico. 
In March 2015, the airlines filed applications for antitrust immunity, a first step in the creation of a US$1.5 billion joint cooperation agreement (JCA) that will allow Delta and Aeroméxico to jointly sell, and share costs and profits on all Mexico–U.S. routes. 
In May 2015, Mexican regulator approved the JCA; and in the same month, the Mexican Senate approved Open Skies between the U.S. and Mexico. 
 In November 2016, the DOT approved the joint venture under strict conditions that the airlines give up slots in both Mexico City and New York-JFK.
In December 2016, the two airlines made the final agreement to go forward with the JV and antitrust immunity was granted.
 In February 2017, Delta announced an offer to acquire additional shares of Aeroméxico, up to 49%.
On 8 May 2017, the joint commercial agreement went into effect, whereby the airlines share information and jointly determine routes and pricing on all U.S.-Mexico flights, and share costs and profits.

Dreamliners
On 25 July 2012, Aeroméxico CEO Andrés Conesa announced the purchase of six Boeing 787-9 Dreamliners. The new order was added to the package of 20 aircraft that the company had announced in 2011 and nine more Boeing 787-8 Dreamliners already provided. The delivery of the Dreamliners began in the summer of 2013. The total investment is US$11 billion and includes the acquisition of 90 Boeing 737 MAX 8s which began delivering from 2018. The airline took delivery of its first Boeing 787-8 Dreamliner (sourced from the ILFC order book) in early August 2013 and officially launched commercial service on 1 October 2013. Between 2013 and 2015, the remaining eight were delivered (seven leased and two owned by Aeroméxico outright).

In September 2016, Aeroméxico received its first Boeing 787-9 Dreamliner. This particular frame, registered XA-ADL, is named after and painted in a unique commemorating Quetzalcoatl, a major figure in Aztec culture of pre-Hispanic Mexico, as the result of a "Design in the Air" competition hosted by the airline inviting students at select universities in Mexico to submit a potential design to be painted on the airframe.

Branded fares
In February 2018, Aeromexico introduced a new branded fares structure, which included a new Basic fare that did not contain a checked luggage allowance, nor did it allow for seat assignments, upgrades, or changes.

2020

Bankruptcy 
The COVID-19 pandemic deeply affected the global aviation industry, including Aeromexico. Aeromexico's stock dropped during first half of 2020 and rumors about bankruptcy appeared, however on June 19, the company denied these rumors. On June 30, Aeroméxico voluntarily filed for Chapter 11 bankruptcy in the United States. However, day-to-day operations will continue as the company restructures. Existing tickets should still be honored, and employees will continue to be paid as usual, according to management.

On July 1, 2021, shareholder Delta Air Lines announced it would purchase $185 million of the Mexican airline's Chapter 11 debt.

Corporate affairs

Headquarters
Its headquarters are in Colonia Cuauhtémoc, Cuauhtémoc Borough, Mexico City.

Subsidiaries
 Aeroméxico Connect, formerly Aerolitoral, a regional airline based at Monterrey International Airport

Former subsidiaries
 Aeromexico Express was a commuter airline based at Monterrey International Airport. It was a partnership between Aeromexico and Aeromar. It ceased to exist in June 2016 when the two wet-leased ATR 72-600 it used to operate its routes were returned to Aeromar.
 Aeroméxico Contigo, Aeromexico's brand for select U.S.-Mexico flights
 Aerovias Guest
 Aeroperú, Peru's national flag carrier based in Lima International Airport
 Mexicana, from 1993 to 1995
 Aeromexpress, a cargo handler based at Mexico City International Airport in Mexico City
 Aeroméxico Travel, a charter airline based in Cancún International Airport

Corporate Image
1960s–1970s – Mexico's largest airline
1990s – La línea aérea mas puntual del mundo.
Before 2009 – Travel the world (Vamos por el mundo)
2010–2012 – A donde te lleven tus sueños.
2012–2013 – Nunca nos detenemos.
2013–present – La línea que nos une.
2016–present – La línea de los Mexicanos y del mundo.
 English slogan: "Mexico's Global Airline"

Technology
In 2016, Aeroméxico added 2Ku WiFi service by Gogo to some 737-800 aircraft, including access to Netflix. On its 787-8 and 787-9 Dreamliners it added Panasonic broadband Internet, and on Embraer narrowbody aircraft, streaming entertainment via Gogo's Gogo Vision.

In July 2016, the airline launched a completely new website and new check-in kiosks at Mexico City airport. That same year, the airline also co-sponsored the launch of startup accelerator MassChallenge in Mexico.

In August 2017, the company became the Mexico launch customers of digital agency MediaMonks and together, they released a new mobile app

Chat platform
In September 2016, Aeromexico became the first airline in the Americas to launch a chatbot, that enables customers to search, track and book flights interacting with a virtual assistant on Facebook Messenger. During the Facebook F8 conference in April 2017, the airline earned praise from Facebook for being among the first companies worldwide to launch the Chat Extension function, allowing users to pull up Aerobot during a group chat. It also launched the ability to ask any question, using artificial intelligence and natural language processing techniques to match the questions with answers.

In September 2017, Aeromexico announced that it would be among the first companies worldwide to start services on WhatsApp's new Enterprise solution – the first time large companies would be able to provide customer service to users at scale. In February 2018 the company announced development of further features together with its partner Yalochat, such as purchase confirmation and flight notifications via WhatsApp, and deepening the artificial intelligence used on its chat platform.

Destinations

New destinations
In an attempt to gain more worldwide presence and strengthen its network and to make connections easier and more frequent, Aeroméxico entered new international markets. In 2006 it started operations to Tokyo from Mexico City via Tijuana. Service to Shanghai from Mexico City via Tijuana began in May 2008. New destinations in 2015–2016 included Panama City (Panama), Santo Domingo, Vancouver, Toronto, Boston, Medellín, Amsterdam, Cozumel, and Austin (Texas). The airline launched service to Seoul from Mexico City (with a stop in Monterrey only on the outbound flight) on 1 July 2017.

In the first year of the Delta–Aeromexico joint venture (June 2017–June 2018) the companies worked to enhance connectivity between Mexico and the U.S., and launched new Aeroméxico or Delta flights, or additional frequencies, on Los Angeles-Cabo San Lucas; New York JFK-Cancun; Detroit-León; Atlanta-Mérida; Seattle-Mexico City; Atlanta-Querétaro; Atlanta-León; Portland-Mexico City; Los Angeles-Leon; Atlanta-Guadalajara; and Guadalajara-Salt Lake City.

Codeshare agreements
Aeroméxico codeshares with the following airlines:

 Aeroflot
 Aerolíneas Argentinas
 Air Europa
 Air France
 Avianca
 China Airlines
 China Eastern Airlines
 Copa Airlines
 Czech Airlines
 Delta Air Lines (Joint Venture Partner)
 El Al
 Garuda Indonesia
 Gol Transportes Aéreos
 ITA Airways
 Japan Airlines
 Kenya Airways
 KLM
 Korean Air
 LATAM
 Middle East Airlines
 Saudia
 TAROM
 Vietnam Airlines
 Virgin Atlantic
 WestJet
 XiamenAir

Fleet

Current fleet

Aeromexico utilizes an all-Boeing fleet. , the mainline Aeromexico fleet operates the following aircraft:

Former fleet

 Avro Anson
 Bellanca Pacemaker
 Beechcraft 17 Staggerwing
 Boeing 247D
 Boeing 757-200
 Boeing 767-200ER
 Boeing 767-300ER
 Boeing 777-200ER
 Bristol Britannia
 Convair 340
 Douglas DC-3
 Douglas DC-4
 Douglas DC-6
 Douglas DC-8
 Lockheed Constellation
 McDonnell Douglas DC-9-15
 McDonnell Douglas DC-9-30
 McDonnell Douglas DC-10-15
 McDonnell Douglas DC-10-30
 McDonnell Douglas MD-82
 McDonnell Douglas MD-83
 McDonnell Douglas MD-87
 McDonnell Douglas MD-88
 Stinson SR
 Travel Air

Accidents, incidents and hijackings

Aeronaves de México
 26 March 1954 near Monterrey, México – XA-GUN a Douglas DC-3.
 2 June 1958 near Guadalajara, México – XA-MEV, a Lockheed L-749A Constellation operating as Flight 111, crashed into La Latilla Mountain, 16 kilometers (10 miles) from the Guadalajara Airport, shortly after takeoff for a flight to Mexico City after the airliner's crew failed to follow the established climb-out procedure for Guadalajara Airport. The crash killed all 45 people on board, and two prominent American scientists – oceanographer Townsend Cromwell and fisheries scientist Bell M. Shimada – were among the dead. It was the deadliest aviation accident in Mexican history at the time.
 19 January 1961 in New York City (Idlewild) – XA-XAX a Douglas DC-8-21
 13 August 1966 near Acapulco, Mexico – XA-PEI a Douglas DC-8-51.
 24 December 1966 Lake Texcoco, Mexico – XA-NUS a Douglas DC-8-51
 12 June 1967 near La Paz, México – XA-FUW a Douglas DC-3A

Aerovias de Mexico (AeroMexico) 
 On 20 June 1973 Douglas DC-9-15 XA-SOC near Puerto Vallarta, Mexico, Aeroméxico Flight 229, a daily service from George Bush Intercontinental Airport to Lic. Gustavo Díaz Ordaz International Airport, crashed into the side of a mountain while on approach, killing all 27 people on board.
 2 September 1976 Douglas DC-9-15 XA-SOF operating as Aeromexico Flight 152 overran the runway at Leon/Guanajuato-Del Bajio Airport where it was damaged beyond repair. No injuries were reported.
 On November  11, 1979, an Aeromexico DC-10, named "Castillo de Chapultepec" and operating as AM flight 945 from Frankfurt to Mexico City, with a stop-over in Miami, experienced trouble over Luxembourg. The airplane lost almost 12,000 feet of altitude, beginning at 29,800 feet and ending at about 18,000 feet. The crew at first wanted to divert to Madrid but decided to continue the flight to Miami instead. The plane landed in Miami without further incident but upon de-boarding it, crews discovered that a portion of the outboard elevators and of the lower fuselage tail area maintenance access door had fallen off during the flight. There were no injuries to the 311 passengers and crew on board.
 On 27 July 1981, Aeromexico Flight 230 XA-DEN a Douglas DC-9-32 crashed while landing in Chihuahua, killing 32 of the 66 people on board.
 8 November 1981 XA-DEO a Douglas DC-9-32 in Sierra de Guerrero, México.
 On 31 August 1986 Aeromexico Flight 498, operated with a McDonnell Douglas DC-9-32, was on its final approach into LAX when it collided with a Piper PA-28 Archer over Cerritos, California. The resulting crash killed all 67 people on both aircraft and 15 people on the ground in Cerritos.
 On 6 October 2000, Aeroméxico Flight 250 N936ML a Douglas DC-9-31 overran the runway at General Lucio Blanco International Airport, Reynosa, Mexico, killing 4 people on the ground.
 On 9 September 2009 Aeroméxico Flight 576 was hijacked between Cancún and Mexico City. The hijacking ended in Mexico City with no casualties.
 On 20 May 2017, Aeroméxico Flight 642, a Boeing 737-800, collided with a utility truck at LAX, injuring 8 people, two of them seriously.
 On 31 July 2018, Aeroméxico Connect Flight 2431 crashed on takeoff from Durango International Airport. Shortly after becoming airborne, the plane encountered sudden wind shear caused by a microburst. The plane rapidly lost speed and altitude and impacted the runway, detaching the engines and skidding to a halt about 1,000 feet (300 m) beyond the runway. The plane caught fire and was destroyed. All 103 people on board survived, but 39 passengers and crew members were injured. 
 On 5 January 2023, Aeroméxico Connect Flight 165 operated with an Embraer 190, registration code XA-ALW, aborted takeoff from Culiacán International Airport after being hit by a bullet. The projectile impacted the lower part of the empennage, below the horizontal stabilizer, causing a hydraulic systems failure in the aircraft. Passengers and cabin crew were uninjured. The bullet was shot during a series of clashes between Mexican Armed Forces and criminal groups in the surroundings of the airport, after a drug cartel leader was captured by Mexican authorities. In the same fashion, two Mexican Air Force airplanes, a B737-800 and a CASA C-295, which were in the airport were damaged.

See also
 Airports and air travel in Mexico
 List of companies of Mexico
 Transportation in Mexico

References

External links

 
 Official website 
  

 
Airlines established in 1934
Airlines of Mexico
Companies based in Mexico City
Companies that filed for Chapter 11 bankruptcy in 1988
Companies that filed for Chapter 11 bankruptcy in 2020
Government-owned companies of Mexico
Latin American and Caribbean Air Transport Association
Mexican brands
Mexican companies established in 1934
SkyTeam